Franciszek Kostrzewski (19 April 1826, Warsaw – 30 September 1911, Warsaw) was a Polish illustrator, cartoonist, caricaturist, comics artist  and painter in the Realistic style.

Biography 
His father was the steward of a city estate. In 1831, following the November Uprising, his family moved to a rural estate in the Sandomierz Voivodeship. He later returned to Warsaw to pursue his studies.

By the time he reached the gymnasium level, he had grown tired of the curriculum and decided to become an artist. His father had other plans, however, and found him a position as a midshipman. Not long after, he was fired when his supervisor found him making sketches on important documents. Following that incident, his father finally relented and, in 1844, he enrolled at the new .

His teachers there included Jan Feliks Piwarski, Chrystian Breslauer and Aleksander Kokular. During his studies, he travelled around the country, painting landscapes, cityscapes and genre scenes; including time spent in Kielce at the invitation of the prominent art collector Tomasz Zieliński (1802–1858). From 1852 to 1853, he worked under the direction of Henryk Pillati, painting decorations for steamships.

He was also one of many who illustrated the works of Adam Mickiewicz, as well as the lesser-known works of Władysław Syrokomla and Teofil Lenartowicz.

Over time, his illustrations came to be less critical or satirical and represent a realistic chronicle of life in the capital. He exhibited frequently at the Kraków Society of Friends of Fine Arts and its counterpart in Warsaw, as well as at several commercial salons. He published his memoirs in 1891.

Selected works

See also 
 Maria Zandbang

References

Further reading 
 Irena Jakimowicz: Franciszek Kostrzewski, Wiedza Powszechna. Państwowe Wydawnictwo Popularno Naukowe, Warsaw, 1952.
 Janusz Durko (ed.) with Irena Tessaro-Kosimowa, Maria Suchodolska and Janina Obidzińska: Franciszek Kostrzewski: katalog prac, Museum of Warsaw, 1963

External links 

 Arcadja Auctions: More works by Kostrzewski.

1826 births
1911 deaths
Burials at Powązki Cemetery
19th-century Polish painters
19th-century Polish male artists
20th-century Polish painters
20th-century Polish male artists
Artists from Warsaw
Polish illustrators
Polish cartoonists
Polish caricaturists
Polish comics artists
Polish landscape painters
Polish male painters